Arkeisha Antoinette Knight, known professionally as Kash Doll, is an American rapper and actress from Detroit, Michigan. Signed to Republic Records, she is best known for her singles "For Everybody" (2017) and "Ice Me Out" (2018), the latter of which became the lead single from her debut album Stacked (2019). Kash Doll has collaborated with artists including Meek Mill, Big Sean, Iggy Azalea, and K. Michelle.

Early life 
Kash Doll was born and raised in Detroit, Michigan. The oldest of six siblings, she began working at a young age to help her single mother support their family. She had the desire to rap at an early age and started freestyling and writing lyrics as a young girl.

She attended Henry Ford College for business management but left after a year. To support the financial needs of her family, Kash became a strip club dancer. While working as a dancer, Kash would rap and eventually started earning money from patrons at the nightclub without having to dance. It was reported that one night she made $26,000.

Career 
Early in her career, Kash Doll performed in local clubs, schools and charity events in the Detroit area. Kash Doll later signed a deal with a local recording company in Detroit which later fell through. She then began using social media to build a following by releasing short videos of herself rapping. Drake used Instagram to invite her to open a show for him on his Summer Sixteen tour stop in Detroit.

Kash Doll remixed Tinashe's single "2 On" in 2015. She then released a video for a single called "Run Me My Money", which went viral in 2015. That same year she released her mixtape, Keisha vs Kash Doll. In December 2017, Kash Doll appeared on Big Sean and Metro Boomin's single "So Good". After being released from her previous deal, on July 16, 2018, she released an EP called The Vault on streaming platforms. One music video from the EP, "For Everybody", received over 10 million views on YouTube.

She released a mixtape called Brat Mail on her birthday in 2018. It was dedicated to her fans, who she refers to as "bratz". In August 2018, Kash Doll signed a record deal with Republic Records. She then released her first single as a part of that deal, "Ice Me Out". Kash Doll released a single called "Hustla" in April 2019, which highlights her experiences from working at strip clubs. She stated that she is trying to awareness for and advocate on behalf of the women in that industry. On June 7, 2019, Kash Doll released a new single titled "Kitten" that features American rapper Lil Wayne. Kash Doll featured on Australian rapper Iggy Azalea's single "Fuck It Up" from Azalea's 2019 studio album, In My Defense. Kash Doll was also an opening performer for Meek Mill's 2019 The Motivation Tour.

She made her TV debut as herself in 2 episodes of Empire in 2020. She has a recurring role as Monique in Starz series BMF as of 2021.

Personal life

In September 2021, Kash Doll announced on Instagram that she was expecting her first child with Detroit rapper, Tracy T. She gave birth to their son on January 6, 2022.

Filmography

Discography

Albums

Collaboration Albums

Mixtapes

Extended plays

Singles

As lead artist

As featured artist

Awards and nominations 

!
|-
|align=center|2018
|Herself
|Detroit Music Award for Outstanding Rap MC
|
|
|-
|2018
|Herself 
|BET Social Award for "Issa Wave"
|
|
|-
|align=center|2019
|Herself
|BET Awards 2019 for Best Female Hip-Hop Artist
|
|
|-
|align=center|2020
|Stacked
|Detroit Music Award for Outstanding National Major Record Label Recording
|
|
|-

See also 
 Women in hip hop

References

External links 

Living people
American women rappers
Rappers from Detroit
21st-century American rappers
African-American women rappers
Republic Records artists
21st-century American women
21st-century African-American women
21st-century African-American musicians
1989 births
21st-century women rappers